Mark Alistair John Pearson (born June 18, 1987) is a Canadian retired field hockey player. He has represented Canada in three Summer Olympics and two World Cups.

From 2009, he played for Der Club an der Alster, Hamburg, Germany.

International career
In 2016, he was named to Canada's Olympic team. In June 2019, he was selected in the Canada squad for the 2019 Pan American Games. They won the silver medal as they lost 5–2 to Argentina in the final.

In June 2021, Pearson was named to Canada's 2020 Summer Olympics team. He announced his retirement from the national team in December 2021.

References

External links

Mark Pearson at Field Hockey Canada

1987 births
Living people
Canadian male field hockey players
Field hockey players from Vancouver
Male field hockey forwards
2010 Men's Hockey World Cup players
2018 Men's Hockey World Cup players
Field hockey players at the 2008 Summer Olympics
Field hockey players at the 2016 Summer Olympics
Field hockey players at the 2020 Summer Olympics
Field hockey players at the 2011 Pan American Games
Olympic field hockey players of Canada
Field hockey players at the 2014 Commonwealth Games
Field hockey players at the 2015 Pan American Games
Field hockey players at the 2019 Pan American Games
Commonwealth Games competitors for Canada
Pan American Games silver medalists for Canada
Pan American Games medalists in field hockey
Der Club an der Alster players
West Vancouver Field Hockey Club players
Men's Feldhockey Bundesliga players
Medalists at the 2011 Pan American Games
Medalists at the 2015 Pan American Games
Medalists at the 2019 Pan American Games